Christ Church, Welshpool was commissioned by the Earl of Powis to commemorate his son, Edward James, the Viscount Clive, having come of age. It was designed by Thomas Penson and completed 1839–44. The church is characterised by its impressive Romanesque Revival architecture in volcanic Trachyte from the Earl of Powis' Standard quarry in Welshpool. The church consists of a 7-bay nave with offset west tower, aisles, apse and south porch. The west gable of the nave has a wide doorway with triple arches with chevron moulding, while the tower is supported by massive pilaster buttresses. Christ Church was most noted for its interior decoration, and in particular its early use of terracotta. The church was a Chapel of Ease of Welshpool's St Mary's Church and had a separate endowment. It cost £6000 to build and this was raised by public subscription as well as being supported by the Earl. 
The congregation of Christ Church dropped dramatically during the twentieth century and in 1998 it was closed and sold in 2002 to Karl Meredith and Natalie Bass who are in the process of restoring the church, partly as a house and partly for community use.

Architecture
A large Anglo-Norman church by Thomas Penson, 1839–44, and just earlier than his St Agatha, Llanymynech in Shropshire. Nave, N and s aisles, apse, s porch, NW tower. Exterior very roughly detailed, with huge conical turrets and massive buttressing. Interior of a grand Romanesque kind, with columns with scalloped capitals, a clerestory, si and a flat ceiling.

Terracotta Work
In this church moulded yellow bricks and terracotta were used for the Romanesque arches of the nave and for the apsidal vaulting of the ceiling. It is likely that Penson, whose offices were at Oswestry was using the experimental terracotta that was being produced at the brickyards connected with the Oswestry Coalfield between Trefonen and Morda. Penson also used terracotta for Llanymynech church, St David's Church Newtown and the porch at Llangedwyn

Church Furnishings

Font
The font is very finely cast in terracotta and is reminiscent of Coade stone. A similar, but later cast stone font is at Leighton Church, near Welshpool.

Woodwork
The carved woodwork of the pews is impressive and particularly the armorial finials of the Earl of Powis’  family pews. These are finer than the similar pew ends in Leighton church.

Organ

The church has an important organ by Gray of 1817.

Encaustic Tiles
The church has some fine decorative encaustic floor tiles. Some of these were manufactured by Minton, but the source of armorial tiles with the Royal Coats of Arms, the Earls of Powis and the Bishops of St Asaph have not been identified.

Stained Glass
Three apse windows probably by David Evans of 1844, Three windows by A O Hemming of 1892

Churchyard

Those buried here include judge William Henry Watson, and members of the family of the Earls of Powis. The Commonwealth War Graves Commission register and maintain the graves of 12 British service personnel, comprising one officer and six soldiers of the army and one Royal Air Force airman of World War I, and three army soldiers and one officer and one airman of the Royal Air Force of World War I, including two brothers, Viscounts Clive, who were sons of the 4th Earl of Powis.

Literature
Thomas D R The History of the Diocese of St Asaph, Caxton Press, Oswestry 1908 (2nd ed.), Vol 3, 181–3
R Scourfield and R Haslam The Buildings of Wales: Powys; Montgomeryshire, Radnorshire and Breconshire Yale University Press 2013.
Stratton, M. (1993) The Terracotta Revival : Building Innovation and the Image of the Industrial City in Britain and North America. London : Gollancz.

References

External links
 Royal Commission on the Ancient and Historical Monuments: Coflein 
Karl Meredith and Natalie Bass: Christ Church, Welshpool Blogspot 
Photos on Flickr:
Artwork at Christ Church, Welshpool

Welshpool, Christ Church
Churches in Powys
Welshpool
Romanesque Revival church buildings in the United Kingdom
Thomas Penson buildings and structures